The Day of Valor, officially known as , is a national observance in the Philippines which commemorates the fall of Bataan to Japanese troops during World War II. It falls every April 9, although in 2009, its celebration was moved to April 6 to avoid it from coinciding with Maundy Thursday.

Due to Bataan's significance in World War II, the holiday was officially known as Bataan Day prior to the 2000s. In the United States, the holiday is celebrated in Maywood, Illinois, where it is referred to by its old name.

Background 

At dawn on April 9, 1942, against the orders of Generals Douglas MacArthur and Jonathan Wainwright, the commander of the Luzon Force, Bataan, Major General Edward P. King, Jr., surrendered more than 76,000 starving and disease-ridden soldiers (64,000 Filipinos, and 12,000 Americans) to Japanese troops.

The majority of these prisoners of war had their belongings confiscated before being forced to endure the infamous  Bataan Death March to Camp O'Donnell in Capas, Tarlac. En route, thousands died from dehydration, heat prostration, untreated wounds, and wanton execution while walking in deep dust over vehicle-broken Macadam roads, and crammed into rail cars for transport to captivity.

Prisoners were beaten randomly and often denied promised food and water. Those who fell behind were usually executed or left to die, with the sides of the roads becoming littered with dead bodies and those moaning for help.

Only 54,000 of the 76,000 prisoners (66,000 Filipinos and 10,000 Americans) reached their destination; the exact death toll is difficult to assess because thousands of captives were able to escape from their guards. Approximately 3,000 prisoners may have died during the march, and 25–30,000 more while in captivity.

History

Philippines 
In April 1961, the president of the Philippines signed Republic Act No. 3022 into law, declaring April 9 of every year as "Bataan Day".

In June 1987, Executive Order No. 203 revised all national holidays in the Philippines, referring to the April 9 holiday as "Araw ng Kagitingan (Bataan and Corregidor Day)". Less than a month later, another executive order (No. 292) revised the holidays anew, again referring to the April 9 holiday as "Araw ng Kagitingan (Bataan and Corregidor Day)".

In 2007, Congress passed Republic Act No. 9492, putting into law the "Holiday Economics" policy of President Gloria Macapagal Arroyo; this put the observance of each holiday, with the exception of New Year's Day and Christmas, to the Monday nearest it. The order referred to the holiday celebrated on the Monday nearest April 9 as "Araw ng Kagitingan (Bataan and Corregidor Day)". Starting in 2008, the holiday was called simply as "Araw ng Kagitingan", and was celebrated on the nearest Monday. This practice was repeated in 2009. In 2010, the holiday was still named as such, but was celebrated on April 9.

Starting with the administration of President Benigno Aquino III, celebrations of the holiday have been observed on April 9, instead of being moved to the nearest Monday, and the holiday has been called simply "Araw ng Kagitingan" in 2011, 2012, 2013, 2014, 2015, and 2016.

The administration of President Rodrigo Duterte followed Aquino's naming and dating of the holiday in 2017, 2018, 2019, 2020, 2021, and 2022.

During the administration of Bongbong Marcos, by virtue of Proclamation 90, Araw ng Kagitingan in 2023 will be celebrated on April 10. The holiday was included in the "holiday economics," adjusting the observance of the holiday to the nearest Monday for a longer weekend.

United States 
The United States Congress passed a joint resolution on April 8, 1954, declaring the next day, April 9, 1954, the 12th anniversary of the fall of Bataan, as "Bataan Day." The joint resolution also mentioned that Philippine president Ramon Magsaysay had earlier declared it to be such.

On April 8, 1987, U.S. president Ronald Reagan, by virtue of Senate Joint Resolution 47 declared April 9, 1987, as "National Former POW Recognition Day". President Joe Biden continued the tradition, declaring April 9, 2021, as such.

Observance

Philippines 
The observance usually is centered on Mount Samat National Shrine in Pilar, Bataan. It is usually attended by the President of the Philippines, the Governor of Bataan, the ambassadors of the United States and Japan, and surviving veterans groups.

By 2021, there were only 2,952 defenders of Bataan who are still alive.

2012 
In 2012, the 70th anniversary of the Fall of Bataan was commemorated at Mount Samat Shrine in Pilar, Bataan by some of the over 18,000 still-living Filipino veterans.

Then-incumbent President Benigno S. Aquino III and former President Fidel V. Ramos attended the rites. Japanese ambassador to the Philippines Toshina Urabe expressed "deep apology and a deep sense of remorse to the tragedy", while the United States Deputy Chief of Mission Leslie A. Bassett (representing U.S. ambassador Harry K. Thomas Jr.) said that their embassy has provided a total of US$220 million (over ₱9 billion) to Filipino war veterans.

United States 
In Maywood, Illinois the second Sunday in September is remembered as Bataan Day. Maywood provided Illinois National Guard soldiers of the 192nd Tank Battalion who served on Bataan.

References 

Public holidays in the Philippines
April observances